Giyagaramakhi (Dargwa: Гиягарамахьи) is a rural locality (a selo) in Natsinsky Selsoviet, Akushinsky District, Republic of Dagestan, Russia. The population was 71 as of 2010. There are 2 streets.

Geography 
Giyagaramakhi is located 30 km south of Akusha (the district's administrative centre) by road. Tuzlamakhi is the nearest rural locality.

References 

Rural localities in Akushinsky District